Luc-Arsène Diamesso (born 27 December 1974) is a Congolese former footballer who played as a centre-back. He represented the Congo national team at the 2000 African Cup of Nations.

References

1974 births
Living people
People from Plateaux Department (Republic of the Congo)
Republic of the Congo footballers
Association football central defenders
Republic of the Congo international footballers
2000 African Cup of Nations players
CARA Brazzaville players
AS Police (Brazzaville) players
Asante Kotoko S.C. players
BV Cloppenburg players
SV Wilhelmshaven players
Regionalliga players
Republic of the Congo expatriate footballers
Expatriate footballers in Germany
Republic of the Congo expatriate sportspeople in Germany
Expatriate footballers in Ghana
Republic of the Congo expatriate sportspeople in Ghana